Livin' Like Hustlers is the debut album by American hip hop group Above the Law. It was released on February 20, 1990, via Ruthless Records; an advanced promo cassette version was released two months earlier. The ten track record was produced entirely by Dr. Dre and Above the Law and featured a guest performance from N.W.A on the track titled "The Last Song". In addition, Eazy-E served as executive producer of the album. It peaked at number 14 on the Top R&B/Hip-Hop Albums and number 75 on the U.S. Billboard 200.

The album included two hit singles "Murder Rap" and "Untouchable", which both charted at number one on the Hot Rap Songs. The album's lead single, "Murder Rap", also peaked at number 41 on the Hot Dance Music/Maxi-Singles Sales. In 1998, the album was selected as one of The Sources 100 Best Rap Albums Ever.

In popular culture
 "Murder Rap" was featured in the 2009 film Pineapple Express & in the 2004 video game Grand Theft Auto San Andreas .
 "Freedom Of Speech" appeared on the soundtrack to the 1990 film Pump Up The Volume 

Track listing
All songs produced by Dr. Dre and Above the Law.Sample credits'
"Murder Rap" contains elements from "Ironside" by Quincy Jones (1971), "Hook and Sling - Part I" by Eddie Bo (1969), "Keep Your Distance" by Babe Ruth (1976), "Funky Drummer" by James Brown (1970) and "Sister Sanctified" by Stanley Turrentine & Milt Jackson (1972) 
"Untouchable" contains elements from "Light My Fire" by Young-Holt Unlimited (1969), "Ironside" by Quincy Jones (1971), "Funky Drummer" by James Brown (1970), "Fuck Tha Police" by N.W.A (1988) 
"Livin' Like Hustlers" contains elements from "Hikky Burr" by Quincy Jones & Bill Cosby (1971), "The Champ" by The Mohawks (1968), "Hot (I Need to Be Loved, Loved, Loved, Loved)" by James Brown (1975), "Comm. 2" by The D.O.C. (1989) and "The Big Beat" by Billy Squier (1980) 
"Another Execution" contains elements from "Do Your Thing" by Lyn Collins (1972), "Good Old Music" by Funkadelic (1970) and "Afro-Strut" by The Nite-Liters (1972) 
"Menace To Society" contains elements from "Let a Woman Be a Woman, Let a Man Be a Man" by Dyke and the Blazers (1969), "I Got You (I Feel Good)" by James Brown (1965) and "Once You Get It", "This House Is Smokin'", "Do You Like It" by B.T. Express (1974) 
"Just Kickin' Lyrics" contains elements from "Hyperbolicsyllabicsesquedalymistic" by Isaac Hayes (1969), "More Peas" by Fred Wesley & The J.B.'s (1973), "Papa Was Too" by Joe Tex (1966) 
"Ballin'" contains elements from "Why Have I Lost You" by Cameo (1977) 
"Freedom Of Speech" contains elements from "The Message From the Soul Sisters" by Myra Barnes (1970) and "Funky Drummer" by James Brown (1970) 
"Flow On" contains elements from "Move Me No Mountain" by Love Unlimited (1974) and "Paid in Full" by Eric B. & Rakim (1987) 
"The Last Song" contains elements from "Baby Let Me Take You (In My Arms)" by The Detroit Emeralds (1972) and "Gangsta Gangsta" by N.W.A (1988)

Personnel

 Gregory Fernan Hutchinson - lead vocals, additional vocals, producer
 Kevin Michael Gulley - lead vocals, additional vocals, producer
 Arthur Lee Goodman III - additional vocals, producer
 Larry Goodman - additional vocals, producer, management
 Anthony Stewart - additional vocals, producer
 Eric Wright - guest vocals, executive producer
 Andre Young - guest vocals, producer
 Lorenzo Patterson - guest vocals
 Michael Sims - additional vocals, guitar, bass
 Andre "L.A. Dre" Bolton - keyboards
 Brian Gardner - mastering
 Donovan Smith - engineering
 Helane Freeman - art direction
 Peter Dokus - photography
 Jerry Heller - booking

Charts

Weekly charts

Year-end charts

Singles

References

1990 debut albums
Ruthless Records albums
Albums produced by Laylaw
Albums produced by Dr. Dre
Above the Law (group) albums
Albums produced by Cold 187um